This is a list of episodes for the CBS television series The New Dick Van Dyke Show.  All episodes were filmed in color.

Series overview

Episodes

Season 1 (1971–72)

* Unknown

Season 2 (1972–73)

* Unknown

Season 3 (1973–74)

* Unknown

References
 

Dick Van Dyke
New Dick Van Dyke Show